William Carrington Thompson (November 6, 1915 – June 11, 2011) was an American jurist and politician.

Early and Family Life
Thompson was born in Chatham, Virginia.  He attended Hampden-Sydney College and graduated in 1935.  He received his law degree from the University of Virginia Law School in 1938 and was admitted to the bar the same year.

During World War II, Thompson served in the U.S. Navy, at various times patrolling the Eastern shore and in the Pacific Ocean.

Legal and political career
Upon returning to civilian life, Thompson returned to his job as assistant attorney general, then was elected Commonwealth's Attorney for Pittsylvania County, Virginia, where he served from 1948 until 1955.

In 1959, Thompson won election to the House of Delegates, serving as a Democrat representing Danville and Pittsylvania County. He was elected .  In to the Senate of Virginia in 1967, and served until 1972.

Judicial career
The General Assembly elected a him as judge for the Twenty-Second Judicial Circuit in 1973, and he heard cases in Danville as well as Franklin and Pittsylvania Counties.

After Justice Alexander Harman retired, the General Assembly elected Judge Thompson to the Supreme Court of Virginia, effective February 1, 1980.  Justice Thompson retired from active service on the Court three years later, and was succeeded by Justice John Charles Thomas.

Death and legacy
Justice Thompson died at his home in Chatham on June 11, 2011.

References

1915 births
2011 deaths
People from Chatham, Virginia
Democratic Party Virginia state senators
Democratic Party members of the Virginia House of Delegates
Justices of the Supreme Court of Virginia
Virginia lawyers
Hampden–Sydney College alumni
University of Virginia School of Law alumni
20th-century American judges
20th-century American lawyers
Virginia circuit court judges